Mohamed Eshtiwi (born 2 August 1985) is a weightlifter from Libya. He won the gold medal at the 2005 Mediterranean Games in the Men's Middleweight (– 77 kg) division, and carried the flag for Libya at the 2004 Summer Olympics in Athens, Greece.

References
 sports-reference

1985 births
Living people
Libyan male weightlifters
Weightlifters at the 2004 Summer Olympics
Olympic weightlifters of Libya

Mediterranean Games gold medalists for Libya
Competitors at the 2005 Mediterranean Games
Mediterranean Games medalists in weightlifting
20th-century Libyan people
21st-century Libyan people